Topsia Cola is a cola-flavoured soft drink produced in Iran by Damavand Mineral Water Co.

References
Dambedam

Cola brands
Iranian drinks